Puttamraju Kandriga is a village in Nellore district, Andhra Pradesh, India. The village is best known for a model village, adopted by cricketing legend Sachin Tendulkar.

References

Villages in Nellore district